Kolonia Busz  is a settlement in the administrative district of Gmina Szydłowo, within Piła County, Greater Poland Voivodeship, in west-central Poland.

The settlement has a population of 7.

References

Kolonia Busz